Ivesia longibracteata is a rare species of flowering plant in the rose family known by the common names Castle Crags ivesia and longbract mousetail. It is endemic to Shasta County, California, where it is known only from Castle Crags. It grows in rocky granite habitat in the temperate coniferous forest.

Description
Ivesia longibracteata is a perennial herb forming a glandular green tuft of foliage where it grows from crevices in granite rock. The leaves are 2 to 4 centimeters long and are made up of several pairs of lobed leaflets. The inflorescence is a headlike cluster of several flowers 1 or 2 centimeters wide. Each flower is just under a centimeter long and has tiny pale yellow petals.

References

External links
Jepson Manual Treatment — Ivesia longibracteata
Ivesia longibracteata — Photo gallery

longibracteata
Endemic flora of California
Natural history of Shasta County, California
~
Plants described in 1989